1975 in the Philippines details events of note that happened in the Philippines in the year 1975.

Incumbents

 President: Ferdinand Marcos (Independent)
 Chief Justice: Roberto Concepcion

Events

January
 January 22 – In the country's worst fire on record by then, 51 persons are either burned, suffocated, or leaped to their death when a fire sweeps through a factory in a commercial building in Marikina, Rizal. At least 79 others are seriously injured.
 January 25-26 – At least 30 persons were killed during a tropical storm, including 11 who were buried by a landslide and 7 fishermen who died at sea.

February
 February 1 – The Intercontinental Broadcasting Corporation is launched.
 February 3 – Thirty-one persons were killed when fire in an airliner engine forced the pilot to crash-land in Manila.
 February 27–28 – A national referendum was called where the majority of the barangays voted approved the following: a) The use by the President of his power to restructure the local governments in Greater Manila into an integrated system; b) the appointment by the President of the successors of local elective officials (outside the Greater Manila) whose terms of office expired on December 31, 1975; c) the manner the President has been exercising his powers under Martial Law and the Constitution and that the President should continue exercising the same powers; and d) allowing Martial law to continue, not to convene the Interim National Assembly and extend the terms of local officials by appointment, and suspend elections, pursuant to Presidential Decrees Nos. 1366, 1366-A and 1366-B.

April
 April 15 – The Kabataang Barangay (KB) was created by virtue of Presidential Decree No. 684. The decree provided for the organization of KB units in the 42,000 barangays all over the country with the purpose of giving the youth a definite role in community affairs.

May
 May 1 – The Kabataang Barangay elections were held in which about 3 million Filipino youths aged 15 to 18 years old participated.

November 
 November 7 – President Ferdinand Marcos issues Presidential Decree 824 creating the Metropolitan Manila Commission (MMC). It integrates the Philippine capital Manila and adjacent Quezon City with the cities of Pasay and Caloocan and municipalities of Makati, Mandaluyong, San Juan, Las Piñas, Malabon, Navotas, Pasig, Pateros, Parañaque, Marikina, Muntinlupa and Taguig from the province of Rizal and the municipality of Valenzuela from the province of Bulacan to form Metro Manila.

Holidays

As per Act No. 2711 section 29, issued on March 10, 1917, any legal holiday of fixed date falls on Sunday, the next succeeding day shall be observed as legal holiday. Sundays are also considered legal religious holidays. Bonifacio Day was added through Philippine Legislature Act No. 2946. It was signed by then-Governor General Francis Burton Harrison in 1921. On October 28, 1931, the Act No. 3827 was approved declaring the last Sunday of August as National Heroes Day. As per Republic Act No. 3022, April 9th was proclaimed as Bataan Day. Independence Day was changed from July 4 (Philippine Republic Day) to June 12 (Philippine Independence Day) on August 4, 1964.

 January 1 – New Year's Day
 February 22 – Legal Holiday
 March 27 – Maundy Thursday
 March 28 – Good Friday
 April 9 – Araw ng Kagitingan (Day of Valor)
 May 1 – Labor Day
 June 12 – Independence Day 
 July 4 – Philippine Republic Day
 August 13  – Legal Holiday
 August 31 – National Heroes Day
 September 21 – Thanksgiving Day
 November 30 – Bonifacio Day
 December 25 – Christmas Day
 December 30 – Rizal Day

Business and economy
 October 13 – The family of Tony Tan Caktiong opens a Magnolia Ice Cream House, which later became the first Jollibee branch in 1978.

Entertainment and culture

 February 1 – The Intercontinental Broadcasting Corporation is launched in the Philippines.
 December 1 - GMA Radio-Television Arts launches Kapwa Ko Mahal Ko.

Sports
 April 9 – The Philippine Basketball Association is inaugurated at Araneta Coliseum in Quezon City.
 October 1 – The Thrilla in Manila was the third and final boxing match between Muhammad Ali and Joe Frazier for the heavyweight boxing championship of the world, fought at the Araneta Coliseum in Quezon City.

Births

January 16 – Anthony Taberna, TV & Radio host, Anchor

February 7 – Ian Veneracion, actor
February 11 – Lourd de Veyra, TV Host, TV5 & Vocalist of Radioactive Sago Project
February 13 – Ali Peek, basketball player

March 3 – Khadaffy Janjalani, Islamist (d. 2006)
March 10 – Glydel Mercado, actress
March 14 – Rico Yan, actor (d. 2002)
March 24 – Paolo Duterte, politician

May 20 – Miriam Quiambao, actress and first runner-up in Miss Universe 1999

June 26 – Luke Mejares, singer-songwriter

July 15:
 K Brosas, singer and comedian
 Viveika Ravanes, actress

August 2 – Joel Villanueva, politician
August 7 – Almira Muhlach, actress
August 15 – William Antonio, basketball player
August 17 – Carmina Villarroel, actress

September 24 – Francis Adriano, basketball player
September 30 - Jeric Raval, actor

October 17 – Vina Morales, singer and actress

November 3 – Egay Billones, basketball player
November 6 – Tisha Silang, TV host and businesswoman
November 21 – Betong Sumaya, actor and comedian
November 30 – Diego Castro III, journalist and actor 

December 9 – Ina Raymundo, actress, model and singer
December 12 – Abigail Binay, lawyer and politician
December 16 – Aiko Melendez, actress
December 26 – Chris Calaguio, actor
December 29 – William Thio, journalist and TV host

Deaths
January 6 – Sotero Baluyut, Filipino engineer and politician (b. 1889)
January 7 – Macario Peralta Jr., soldier, lawyer, and senator (b. 1913)
January 14 – Miguel Cuaderno Sr., first Governor of the Bangko Sentral ng Pilipinas (b. 1890)
April 13 – Teófilo Sison, Filipino legislator and first Secretary of National Defense (b. 1880) 
June 14 – Pablo Antonio, Filipino modernist architect (b. 1901)

References